722 Frieda (prov. designation:  or ) is a bright background asteroid and slow rotator from the inner regions of the asteroid belt. It was discovered by Austrian astronomer Johann Palisa at the Vienna Observatory on 18 October 1911. It was named after Frieda Hillebrand, daughter of Austrian astronomer  (1861–1939), and grand-daughter of Edmund Weiss (1837–1917) who had been the director of the discovering observatory.

Orbit and classification 

Located in the region of the Flora family, the largest family of stony asteroids, Frieda is a non-family asteroid of the main belt's background population when applying the hierarchical clustering method to its proper orbital elements. It orbits the Sun in the inner asteroid belt at a distance of 1.9–2.5 AU once every 3 years and 2 months (1,169 days; semi-major axis of 2.17 AU). Its orbit has an eccentricity of 0.14 and an inclination of 6° with respect to the ecliptic. The body's observation arc begins at Heidelberg Observatory on 19 January 1912, or three months after its official discovery observation by Johann Palisa at Vienna Observatory.

Naming 

According to Alexander Schnell, this minor planet was named after Frieda Hillebrand, daughter of Austrian astronomer and professor at Graz University,  (1861–1939). Frieda is also the grand-daughter of astronomer Edmund Weiss (1837–1917), who was director of the Vienna Observatory (1877–1908) where this asteroid was discovered. The  was not mentioned in The Names of the Minor Planets by Paul Herget in 1955. Palisa also named asteroid 794 Irenaea after Frieda's mother, Irene Hillebrand (née Weiss).

Physical characteristics 

In the SMASS-I classification by Xu (1995), Frieda is a common, stony S-type asteroid.

Rotation period 

In April 2019, a rotational lightcurve of Frieda was obtained for the first time from 12 nights of photometric observations by American amateur astronomer Tom Polakis at the Command Module Observatory  in Arizona. Lightcurve analysis gave a rotation period of  hours with a high brightness variation of  magnitude.

Diameter and albedo 

The Collaborative Asteroid Lightcurve Link adopts Petr Pravec's revised WISE-data, with an albedo of 0.2721 and a diameter of 8.794 kilometers based on an absolute magnitude of 12.31.

References

External links 
 Lightcurve Database Query (LCDB), at www.minorplanet.info
 Dictionary of Minor Planet Names, Google books
 Discovery Circumstances: Numbered Minor Planets (1)-(5000) – Minor Planet Center
 
 

000722
Discoveries by Johann Palisa
Named minor planets
19111018